Hamsafar  is a 1975 Iranian dramatic-romance film directed by Masoud Asadollah.  It stars Behrouz Vossoughi, Googoosh, and Reza Karem Rezaei.

Plot
A wealthy man who has a company deceives a naive girl Atefeh. The latter believing he wants to marry her goes to the north of Iran to find the wealthy man. Later, Atefeh's father gives Ali 70000 Tomans to get her daughter back home but romance blossoms between the two youngsters on their way back.

Cast 
 Behrouz Vossoughi as Ali
 Googoosh as Atefeh
 Reza Karam Rezaei as Uncle Rostam
 Asgar Samsar Zadah as Gholam Hossein
 Nematollah Gorji as Servant
 Hamideh Kheirabadi as Nadere
 Fahimeh Amouzandeh as Atefeh's sister

References

External links
 

1975 films
1975 romantic drama films
Iranian romantic drama films
1970s drama road movies
Films shot in Iran
Iranian black-and-white films